The Monument to Calvo Sotelo (Spanish: Monumento a Calvo Sotelo) is an instance of public art located in Madrid, Spain. Erected on the south of the Plaza de Castilla, it is dedicated to José Calvo Sotelo.

History and description 
The monument was an initiative of the "National Junta" for the homage to the Glorious Proto-Martyr of the Crusade Don José Calvo Sotelo", an entity reanimated in 1954 by the Francoist dictatorship in order to resume earlier Burgos government's projects dating back to 1938 intending to commemorate the aforementioned politician and delayed by the then ongoing state of war.

The location of the monument was decided in 1958.

Made of reinforced concrete, the single written inscription on the material reads España a Calvo Sotelo ("Spain to Calvo Sotelo").

It was unveiled on 13 July 1960. It was slightly relocated in 1992 during the works of reform of the Plaza de Castilla and put on a raised platform in the south end of the plaza. Its frontal perspective generates an axis of symmetry with the Puerta de Europa twin towers. 

The monument has sparked several controversies, especially regarding the inconvenience for its permanence in the square.

See also 
The Assassination of José Calvo Sotelo

References 
Citations

Bibliography
 
 
 
 
 

Francoist monuments and memorials in Spain
Monuments and memorials in Madrid
Sculptures of men in Spain
Outdoor sculptures in Madrid
Statues of politicians
Buildings and structures in Chamartín District, Madrid